ICRS may refer to:
 International Cannabinoid Research Society, professional society for cannabinoid researchers
 International Celestial Reference System, the IAU standard celestial reference system
 Institute of Corporate Responsibility and Sustainability, professional body for sustainability practitioners
 Intrastromal corneal ring segment, an eye implant for vision correction
 International Castle Research Society